Energy use, import and production in South America is described in the following articles:
Energy in Argentina
Energy in Brazil
Energy in Chile
Energy in Colombia
Energy in Peru
Energy in Uruguay
Energy in Venezuela